Alexander David Stewart (September 19, 1852 – March 13, 1899) was mayor of Hamilton, Ontario, from 1894 to 1895.

Biography 
Stewart was born in Leghorn, Italy. He trained as a doctor at University of Edinburgh, but he never practiced as a doctor. He also studied with Joseph Lister at Aberdeen.

He married Emily Mary Otter in 1878.

He served as Chief of Hamilton Police in Hamilton for six years. In 1885, he was sent to act as Marshall of the Court for the Trial of Louis Riel. Electricity was installed in City Hall during his two-year term. In 1898, he joined an expedition to the Yukon gold fields. He died of scurvy on Somewhere Island, Yukon, at the confluence of the Peel and Beaver Rivers, March 13, 1899, and was buried there.

References
 Hamilton Public Library biography

1852 births
1899 deaths
Mayors of Hamilton, Ontario
Canadian police chiefs
Italian emigrants to Canada
Alumni of the University of Edinburgh
Deaths from scurvy
People from Livorno